Kingman is an unincorporated community in Clinton County, in the U.S. state of Ohio. Nearby North Kingman is also listed by the GNIS as a populated place.

History
Kingman had its start when the railroad was extended to that point. A post office called Kingman was established in 1894, and remained in operation until 1905.

References

Unincorporated communities in Clinton County, Ohio
Unincorporated communities in Ohio